Futbol Club Barcelona, commonly referred to as Barcelona and colloquially known as Barça, is a professional football club based in Barcelona, Catalonia, Spain, that competes in La Liga, the top flight of Spanish football.

Founded in 1899 by a group of Swiss, Catalan, German, and English footballers led by Joan Gamper, the club has become a symbol of Catalan culture and Catalanism, hence the motto "Més que un club" ("More than a club"). Unlike many other football clubs, the supporters own and operate Barcelona. It is the fourth-most valuable sports team in the world, worth $4.76 billion, and the world's fourth richest football club in terms of revenue, with an annual turnover of €582.1 million. The official Barcelona anthem is the "Cant del Barça", written by Jaume Picas and Josep Maria Espinàs. Barcelona traditionally play in dark shades of blue and garnet stripes, hence nicknamed Blaugrana.

Domestically, Barcelona has won a record 76 trophies: 26 La Liga, 31 Copa del Rey, fourteen Supercopa de España, three Copa Eva Duarte, and two Copa de la Liga titles, as well as being the record holder for the latter four competitions. In international club football, the club has won 22 European and worldwide titles: five UEFA Champions League titles, a record four UEFA Cup Winners' Cups, a joint record five UEFA Super Cups, a record three Inter-Cities Fairs Cups, a joint record two Latin Cups and three FIFA Club World Cups. Barcelona was ranked first in the International Federation of Football History & Statistics Club World Ranking for 1997, 2009, 2011, 2012 and 2015, and occupies the seventh position on the UEFA club rankings . The club has a long-standing rivalry with Real Madrid, and matches between the two teams are referred to as El Clásico.

Barcelona is one of the most widely supported teams in the world, and the club has one of the largest social media following in the world among sports teams. Barcelona players have won a record twelve Ballon d'Or awards, with recipients including Johan Cruyff, as well as a record seven FIFA World Player of the Year awards, with winners including Romário, Ronaldo, Rivaldo and Ronaldinho. In 2010, three players who came through the club's youth academy (Lionel Messi, Andrés Iniesta and Xavi) were chosen as the three best players in the world in the FIFA Ballon d'Or awards, an unprecedented feat for players from the same football academy. Additionally, players representing the club have won a record eight European Golden Shoe awards.

Barcelona is one of three founding members of the Primera División that have never been relegated from the top division since its inception in 1929, along with Athletic Bilbao and Real Madrid. In 2009, Barcelona became the first Spanish club to win the continental treble consisting of La Liga, Copa del Rey, and the UEFA Champions League, and also became the first Spanish football club to win six out of six competitions in a single year, by also winning the Spanish Super Cup, UEFA Super Cup, and FIFA Club World Cup. In 2011, the club became European champions again, winning five trophies. This Barcelona team, which won fourteen trophies in just four years under Pep Guardiola, is considered by some in the sport to be the greatest team of all time. By winning their fifth Champions League trophy in 2015 under Luis Enrique, Barcelona became the first European football club in history to achieve the continental treble twice.

History

1899–1922: Beginnings 

On 22 October 1899, Swiss Hans Gamper placed an advertisement in Los Deportes declaring his wish to form a football club; a positive response resulted in a meeting at the Gimnasio Solé on 29 November. Eleven players attended – Walter Wild (the first director of the club), Luis de Ossó, Bartomeu Terradas, Otto Kunzle, Otto Maier, Enric Ducal, Pere Cabot, Carles Pujol, Josep Llobet, John Parsons, and William Parsons – and Foot-Ball Club Barcelona was born.

FC Barcelona had a successful start in regional and national cups, competing in the Campionat de Catalunya and the Copa del Rey. In 1901, the club participated in the very first football competition played on the Iberian Peninsula, the Copa Macaya, narrowly losing to Hispania AC, but in the following year, Barça won the tournament, the club's first-ever piece of silverware, and then participated in the first Copa del Rey, losing 1–2 to Bizcaya (a combination of players from Athletic Club and Bilbao FC) in the final. In 1908, Hans Gamper – now known as Joan Gamper – became club president in a desperate attempt to save Barcelona from extinction, finding the club struggling not just on the pitch, but also financially and socially, after not winning a competition since the Campionat de Catalunya in 1905. He said in a meeting, "Barcelona cannot die and must not die. If there is nobody who is going to try, then I will assume the responsibility of running the club from now on." Club president on five separate occasions between 1908 and 1925, he spent 25 years in total at the helm. One of his main achievements was ensuring Barça acquire its own stadium and thus generate a stable income.

On 14 March 1909, the team moved into the Camp de la Indústria, a stadium with a capacity of 8,000. To celebrate their new surroundings, the club conducted a logo contest the following year. Carles Comamala won the contest, and his suggestion became the crest that the club still wears – with some minor changes – as of the present day.

The stadium is regarded as the main element that helped the club grow in the 1910s and become a dominant team, winning three successive Campionats de Catalunya between 1909 and 1911, three Copa del del Rey in four years between 1910 and 1913, and four successive Pyrenees Cup between the inaugural year in 1910 and 1913, which was one of the earliest international club cups in Europe since it consisted of the best teams of Languedoc, Midi and Aquitaine (Southern France), the Basque Country and Catalonia; all were former members of the Marca Hispanica region. The contest was the most prestigious in that era. Notable figures of Barça's first great team include Carles Comamala, Alfredo Massana, Amechazurra, Paco Bru and Jack Greenwell. The latter became the club's first full-time coach in 1917.

During the same period, the club changed its official language from Castilian to Catalan and gradually evolved into an important symbol of Catalan identity. For many fans, participating in the club had less to do with the game itself and more with being a part of the club's collective identity. On 4 February 1917, the club held its first tribute match to honour Ramón Torralba, who played from 1913 to 1928. The match was against local side Terrassa where Barcelona won the match 6–2.

Gamper simultaneously launched a campaign to recruit more club members, and by 1922, the club had more than 20,000, who helped finance a new stadium. The club then moved to the new Les Cortes, which they inaugurated the same year. Les Cortes had an initial capacity of 30,000, and in the 1940s it was expanded to 60,000.

In 1912, Gamper recruited Paulino Alcántara, the club's seventh all-time top-scorer, and in 1917, Gamper also recruited Jack Greenwell as the first full-time manager in Barcelona's history. After this hiring, the club's fortunes began to improve on the field and soon enjoyed its first "golden age". Along with Alcántara, the Barça team under Greenwell also included Sagibarba, Ricardo Zamora, Josep Samitier, Félix Sesúmaga and Franz Platko. This team won 9 out of 10 Campionats de Catalunya between 1919 and 1928 and two Copa del Rey titles in 1920 and 1922. In total, during the Gamper-led era, Barcelona won eleven Campionats de Catalunya, six Copa del Rey and four Pyrenees Cups.

1923–1957: Rivera, Republic and Civil War 

On 14 June 1925, in a spontaneous reaction against Primo de Rivera's dictatorship, the crowd in the stadium jeered the Royal March. As a reprisal, the ground was closed for six months and Gamper was forced to relinquish the presidency of the club. This coincided with the transition to professional football, and, in 1926, the directors of Barcelona publicly claimed, for the first time, to operate a professional football club.

On 3 July 1927, the club held a second testimonial match for Paulino Alcántara, against the Spanish national team. To kick off the match, local journalist and pilot Josep Canudas dropped the ball onto the pitch from his aeroplane. In 1928, victory in the Spanish Cup was celebrated with a poem titled "Oda a Platko", which was written by a member of the Generation of '27, Rafael Alberti, inspired by the heroic performance of the Barcelona goalkeeper, Franz Platko. On 23 June 1929, Barcelona won the inaugural Spanish League. A year after winning the championship, on 30 July 1930, Gamper committed suicide after a period of depression brought on by personal and financial problems.

Although they continued to have players of the standing of Josep Escolà, the club now entered a period of decline, in which political conflict overshadowed sports throughout society. Attendance at matches dropped as the citizens of Barcelona were occupied with discussing political matters. Although the team won the Campionat de Catalunya in 1930, 1931, 1932, 1934, 1936 and 1938, success at a national level (with the exception of the 1937 disputed title) evaded them.

A month after the Spanish Civil War began in 1936, several players from Barcelona enlisted in the ranks of those who fought against the military uprising, along with players from Athletic Bilbao. On 6 August, Falangist soldiers near Guadarrama murdered club president Josep Sunyol, a representative of the pro-independence political party. He was dubbed the martyr of barcelonisme, and his murder was a defining moment in the history of FC Barcelona and Catalan identity. In the summer of 1937, the squad was on tour in Mexico and the United States, where it was received as an ambassador of the Second Spanish Republic. The tour led to the financial security of the club, but also resulted in half of the team seeking asylum in Mexico and France, making it harder for the remaining team to contest for trophies.

On 16 March 1938, Barcelona came under aerial bombardment from the Italian Air Force, causing more than 3,000 deaths, with one of the bombs hitting the club's offices. A few months later, Catalonia came under occupation and as a symbol of the "undisciplined" Catalanism, the club, now down to just 3,486 members, faced a number of restrictions. All signs of regional nationalism, including language, flag and other signs of separatism were banned throughout Spain. The Catalan flag was banned and the club were prohibited from using non-Spanish names. These measures forced the club to change its name to Club de Fútbol Barcelona and to remove the Catalan flag from its crest.

In 1943, Barcelona faced rivals Real Madrid in the semi-finals of Copa del Generalísimo (now the Copa del Rey). The first match at Les Corts was won by Barcelona 3–0. Real Madrid comfortably won the second leg, beating Barcelona 11–1. According to football writer Sid Lowe, "There have been relatively few mentions of the game [since] and it is not a result that has been particularly celebrated in Madrid. Indeed, the 11–1 occupies a far more prominent place in Barcelona's history. This was the game that first formed the identification of Madrid as the team of the dictatorship and Barcelona as its victims." It has been alleged by local journalist Paco Aguilar that Barcelona's players were threatened by police in the changing room, though nothing was ever proven.

Despite the difficult political situation, CF Barcelona enjoyed considerable success during the 1940s and 1950s. In 1945, with Josep Samitier as coach and players like César, Ramallets and Velasco, they won La Liga for the first time since 1929. They added two more titles in 1948 and 1949. In 1949, they also won the first Copa Latina. In June 1950, Barcelona signed László Kubala, who was to be an important figure at the club.

On a rainy Sunday of 1951, the crowd left Les Corts stadium after a 2–1 win against Santander by foot, refusing to catch any trams, and surprising the Francoist authorities. The reason was simple: at the same time, a tram strike was taking place in Barcelona, receiving the support of blaugrana fans. Events like this made CF Barcelona represent much more than just Catalonia and many progressive Spaniards saw the club as a staunch defender of rights and freedoms.

Coach Ferdinand Daučík and László Kubala led the team to five different trophies including La Liga, the Copa del Generalísimo, the Copa Latina, the Copa Eva Duarte, and the Copa Martini Rossi in 1952. In 1953, the club won La Liga and the Copa del Generalísimo again.

1957–1978: Club de Fútbol Barcelona 

With Helenio Herrera as coach, a young Luis Suárez, the European Footballer of the Year in 1960, and two influential Hungarians recommended by Kubala, Sándor Kocsis and Zoltán Czibor, the team won another national double in 1959 and a La Liga and Fairs Cup double in 1960. In 1961, they became the first club to beat Real Madrid in a European Cup play-off. However, they lost 2–3 to Benfica in the final.

The 1960s were less successful for the club, with Real Madrid monopolising La Liga. The completion of the Camp Nou, finished in 1957, meant the club had little money to spend on new players. The 1960s saw the emergence of Josep Maria Fusté and Carles Rexach, and the club won the Copa del Generalísimo in 1963 and the Fairs Cup in 1966. Barcelona restored some pride by beating Real Madrid 1–0 in the 1968 Copa del Generalísimo final at the Santiago Bernabéu in front of Francisco Franco, with coach Salvador Artigas, a former republican pilot in the Civil War. With the end of Franco's dictatorship in 1974, the club changed its official name back to Futbol Club Barcelona and reverted the crest to its original design, including the original letters once again.

The 1973–74 season saw the arrival of Johan Cruyff, who was bought for a world record £920,000 from Ajax. Already an established player with Ajax, Cruyff quickly won over the Barcelona fans when he told the European press that he chose Barcelona over Real Madrid because he could not play for a club associated with Francisco Franco. He further endeared himself when he named his son "Jordi", after the local Catalan Saint George. Next to champions like Juan Manuel Asensi, Carles Rexach and Hugo Sotil, he helped the club win the 1973–74 season for the first time since 1960, defeating Real Madrid 5–0 at the Santiago Bernabéu en route. He was crowned European Footballer of the Year in 1973 during his first season with Barcelona (his second Ballon d'Or win; he won his first while playing for Ajax in 1971). Cruyff received this prestigious award a third time (the first player to do so) in 1974, while he was still with Barcelona.

1978–2000: Núñez and stabilization 

In 1978, Josep Lluís Núñez became the first elected president of FC Barcelona, and, since then, the members of Barcelona have elected the club president. The process of electing a president of FC Barcelona was closely tied to Spain's transition to democracy in 1974 and the end of Franco's dictatorship. The new president's main objective was to develop Barcelona into a world-class club by giving it stability both on and off the pitch. His presidency was to last for 22 years, and it deeply affected the image of Barcelona, as Núñez held to a strict policy regarding wages and discipline, letting go of such players as Diego Maradona, Romário and Ronaldo rather than meeting their demands.

On 16 May 1979, the club won its first European Cup Winners' Cup by beating Fortuna Düsseldorf 4–3 in Basel in a final watched by more than 30,000 travelling blaugrana fans. The same year, Núñez began to invest in the club's youth programme by converting La Masia into a dormitory for young academy players from abroad. The name of the dormitory would later become synonymous with the youth programme of Barcelona.

In June 1982, Diego Maradona was signed for a world record fee of £5 million from Boca Juniors. In the following season, under coach César Luis Menotti, Barcelona won the Copa del Rey, beating Real Madrid. Maradona's time with Barcelona, however, was short-lived and he soon left for Napoli. At the start of the 1984–85 season, Terry Venables was hired as manager and he won La Liga with noteworthy displays by German midfielder Bernd Schuster. The next season, he took the team to their second European Cup final, only to lose on penalties to Steaua București during a dramatic evening in Seville.

Around this time, tensions began to arise between what was perceived as president Núñez's dictatorial rule and the nationalistic support group, Boixos Nois. The group, identified with a left-wing separatism, repeatedly demanded the resignation of Núñez and openly defied him through chants and banners at matches. At the same time, Barcelona experienced an eruption in skinheads, who often identified with a right-wing separatism. The skinheads slowly transferred the Boixos Nois' ideology from liberalism to fascism, which caused division within the group and a sudden support for Núñez's presidency. Inspired by British hooligans, the remaining Boixos Nois became violent, causing havoc leading to large-scale arrests.

After the 1986 FIFA World Cup, Barcelona signed the English top scorer Gary Lineker, along with goalkeeper Andoni Zubizarreta, but the team could not achieve success, as Schuster was excluded from the team. Terry Venables was subsequently fired at the beginning of the 1987–88 season and replaced with Luis Aragonés. The season finished with the players rebelling against president Núñez, in an event known as the Hesperia mutiny, and a 1–0 victory in the Copa del Rey final against Real Sociedad.

The Dream Team era 

In 1988, Johan Cruyff returned to the club, this time as manager and he assembled what would later be dubbed the "Dream Team". He used a mix of Spanish players like Pep Guardiola, José Mari Bakero, Jon Andoni Goikoetxea, Miguel Angel Nadal and Txiki Begiristain while signing international players such as Ronald Koeman, Michael Laudrup, Romário and Hristo Stoichkov.

It was ten years after the inception of the youth programme, La Masia, when the young players began to graduate and play for their first team. One of the first graduates, who would later earn international acclaim, was future Barcelona coach Pep Guardiola.
Under Cruyff's guidance, Barcelona won four consecutive La Liga titles from 1991 to 1994. They beat Sampdoria in both the 1989 UEFA Cup Winners' Cup final and the 1992 European Cup final at Wembley, with a free kick goal from Dutch international Ronald Koeman. They also won a Copa del Rey in 1990, the European Super Cup in 1992 and three Supercopa de España trophies. With 11 trophies, Cruyff became the club's most successful manager at that point. He also became the club's longest consecutive serving manager, serving eight years. Cruyff's fortune was to change, and, in his final two seasons, he failed to win any trophies and fell out with president Josep Lluís Núñez, resulting in his departure. On the legacy of Cruyff's football philosophy and the passing style of play he introduced to the club, future coach of Barcelona Pep Guardiola would state, "Cruyff built the cathedral, our job is to maintain and renovate it."

Reacting to Cruyff's departure, an independent protest group was organised by Armand Caraben, Joan Laporta and Alfons Godall. The objective of the group, called L'Elefant Blau, was to oppose the presidency of Núñez, which they regarded as a corruption of the club's traditional values. Laporta would later take over the presidency of Barcelona in 2003.

Cruyff was briefly replaced by Bobby Robson, who took charge of the club for a single season in 1996–97. He recruited Ronaldo for a world record transfer fee from his previous club, PSV and delivered a cup treble, winning the Copa del Rey, UEFA Cup Winners' Cup and the Supercopa de España, with Ronaldo registering 47 goals in 49 games. Despite his success, Robson was only ever seen as a short-term solution while the club waited for Louis van Gaal to become available.

Like Maradona, Ronaldo only stayed a short time before he left for Inter Milan in another world record transfer. However, new heroes emerged, such as Luís Figo, Patrick Kluivert, Luis Enrique and Rivaldo, and the team won a Copa del Rey and La Liga double in 1998. In 1999, the club celebrated its centenari, winning the Primera División title, and Rivaldo became the fourth Barcelona player to be awarded European Footballer of the Year. Despite this domestic success, the failure to emulate Real Madrid in the Champions League led to van Gaal and Núñez resigning in 2000.

2000–2008: Exit Núñez, enter Laporta 

The departures of Núñez and Van Gaal were hardly noticed by the fans when compared to that of Luís Figo, then club vice-captain. Figo had become a cult hero and was considered by Catalans to be one of their own. Barcelona fans, however, were distraught by Figo's decision to join arch-rivals Real Madrid, and, during subsequent visits to the Camp Nou, Figo was given an extremely hostile reception. Upon his first return, a piglet's head and a full bottle of whiskey were thrown at him from the crowd. The next three years saw the club in decline, and managers came and went. Van Gaal was replaced by Lorenzo Serra Ferrer who, despite an extensive investment in players in the summer of 2000, presided over a mediocre league campaign and a first-round Champions League exit, and was dismissed late in the season. Long-serving Barcelona deputy coach Carles Rexach was appointed as his replacement, initially on a temporary basis, and managed to at least steer the club to the last Champions League spot on the final day of the season against Valencia via an exceptional performance from Rivaldo, who completed arguably the greatest hat-trick in history with an overhead bicycle kick winner in the final minute to secure qualification.

Despite better form in La Liga and a good run to the semi-finals of the Champions League, Rexach was never viewed as a long-term solution and that summer Van Gaal returned to the club for a second spell as manager. What followed, despite another decent Champions League performance, was one of the worst La Liga campaigns in the club's history, with the team as low as 15th in February 2003. This led to Van Gaal's resignation and replacement for the rest of the campaign by Radomir Antić, though a sixth-place finish was the best that he could manage. At the end of the season, Antić's short-term contract was not renewed, and club president Joan Gaspart resigned, his position having been made completely untenable by such a disastrous season on top of the club's overall decline in fortunes since he became president three years prior.

After the disappointment of the Gaspart era, the combination of a new young president, Joan Laporta, and a young new manager, former Dutch and AC Milan star Frank Rijkaard, saw the club bounce back. On the field, an influx of international players, including Ronaldinho, Deco, Henrik Larsson, Ludovic Giuly, Samuel Eto'o, Rafael Márquez and Edgar Davids, combined with home grown Spanish players, such as Carles Puyol, Andrés Iniesta, Xavi and Víctor Valdés, led to the club's return to success. Barcelona won La Liga and the Supercopa de España in 2004–05, and Ronaldinho and Eto'o were voted first and third, respectively, in the FIFA World Player of the Year awards.

In the 2005–06 season, Barcelona repeated their league and Supercopa successes. The pinnacle of the league season arrived at the Santiago Bernabéu in a 3–0 win over Real Madrid. It was Rijkaard's second victory at the Bernabéu, making him the first Barcelona manager to win there twice. Ronaldinho's performance was so impressive that after his second goal, which was Barcelona's third, some Real Madrid fans gave him a standing ovation. In the Champions League, Barcelona beat the English club Arsenal in the final. Trailing 1–0 to a ten-man Arsenal and with less than 15 minutes remaining, they came back to win 2–1, with substitute Henrik Larsson, in his final appearance for the club, setting up goals for Samuel Eto'o and fellow substitute Juliano Belletti, for the club's first European Cup victory in 14 years.

Despite being the favourites and starting strongly, Barcelona finished the 2006–07 season without trophies. A pre-season US tour was later blamed for a string of injuries to key players, including leading scorer Eto'o and rising star Lionel Messi. There was open feuding as Eto'o publicly criticised coach Rijkaard and Ronaldinho. Ronaldinho also admitted that a lack of fitness affected his form. In La Liga, Barcelona were in first place for much of the season, but inconsistency in the New Year saw Real Madrid overtake them to become champions. Barcelona advanced to the semi-finals of the Copa del Rey, winning the first leg against Getafe 5–2, with a goal from Messi bringing comparison to Diego Maradona's goal of the century, but then lost the second leg 4–0. They took part in the 2006 FIFA Club World Cup, but were beaten by a late goal in the final against Brazilian side Internacional. In the Champions League, Barcelona were knocked out of the competition in the last 16 by eventual runners-up Liverpool on away goals.

Barcelona finished the 2007–08 season third in La Liga and reached the semi-finals of the UEFA Champions League and Copa del Rey, both times losing to the eventual champions, Manchester United and Valencia, respectively. The day after a 4–1 defeat to Real Madrid, Joan Laporta announced that Barcelona B coach Pep Guardiola would take over Frank Rijkaard's duties on 30 June 2008.

2008–2012: Guardiola era 

Barcelona B youth manager Pep Guardiola took over Frank Rijkaard's duties at the conclusion of the season. Guardiola brought with him the now famous tiki-taka style of play he had been taught during his time in the Barcelona youth teams. In the process, Guardiola sold Ronaldinho and Deco and started building the Barcelona team around Xavi, Andrés Iniesta and Lionel Messi.

Barça beat Athletic Bilbao 4–1 in the 2009 Copa del Rey Final, winning the competition for a record-breaking 25th time. A historic 2–6 victory against Real Madrid followed three days later and ensured that Barcelona became 2008–09 La Liga champions. Barça finished the season by beating Manchester United 2–0 at the Stadio Olimpico in Rome, with goals from Eto'o and Messi, to win their third Champions League title, and complete the first ever treble won by a Spanish team. The team went on to win the 2009 Supercopa de España against Athletic Bilbao and the 2009 UEFA Super Cup against Shakhtar Donetsk, becoming the first European club to win both domestic and European Super Cups following a treble. In December 2009, Barcelona won the 2009 Club World Cup. Barcelona accomplished two new records in Spanish football in 2010 as they retained the La Liga trophy with 99 points and won the Supercopa de España for a ninth time.

After Laporta's departure from the club in June 2010, Sandro Rosell was soon elected as the new president. The elections were held on 13 June, where he got 61.35% (57,088 votes, a record) of total votes. Rosell signed David Villa from Valencia for €40 million and Javier Mascherano from Liverpool for €19 million. At the 2010 World Cup in South Africa, Barcelona players that had graduated from the club's La Masia youth system would play a major role in Spain becoming world champions. On 11 July, seven players who came through the academy participated in the final, six of whom were Barcelona players who started the match, with Iniesta scoring the winning goal against the Netherlands.

In November 2010, Barcelona defeated their main rival Real Madrid 5–0 in El Clásico.
At the ceremony for the 2010 FIFA Ballon d'Or in December, Barcelona's La Masia became the first youth academy ever to have all three finalists for the Ballon d'Or, with Messi, Iniesta and Xavi being named the three best players in the world for 2010. In the 2010–11 season, Barcelona retained the La Liga trophy, their third title in succession, finishing with 96 points. In April 2011, the club reached the Copa del Rey final, losing 1–0 to Real Madrid at the Mestalla Stadium in Valencia. In May, Barcelona defeated Manchester United in the 2011 Champions League Final 3–1 held at Wembley Stadium, a repeat of the 2009 final, winning their fourth European Cup. In August 2011, La Masia graduate Cesc Fàbregas was bought from Arsenal and he would help Barcelona defend the Spanish Supercup against Real Madrid. The Supercup victory brought the total number of official trophies to 73, matching the number of titles won by Real Madrid.

Later the same month, Barcelona won the UEFA Super Cup defeating Porto 2–0 with goals from Messi and Fàbregas. This extended the club's overall number of official trophies to 74, surpassing Real Madrid's total amount of official trophies. The Super Cup victory also saw Guardiola win his 12th trophy out of a possible 15 in his three years at the helm of the club, becoming the all-time record holder of most titles won as a coach at Barcelona.

In December, Barcelona won the Club World Cup for a record second time since its establishment, after defeating 2011 Copa Libertadores holders Santos 4–0 in the final thanks to two goals from Messi and goals from Xavi and Fàbregas. As a result, the overall trophy haul during the reign of Guardiola was further extended and saw Barcelona win their 13th trophy out of a possible 16. Considered by some in the sport to be the greatest team of all time, with Manchester United manager Alex Ferguson stating, ”They mesmerise you with their passing”, their five trophies in 2011 saw them receive the Laureus World Sports Award for Team of the Year.

In the 2011–12 season, Barcelona lost the semi-finals of the Champions League against Chelsea. Guardiola, who had been on a rolling contract and had faced criticism over his recent tactics and squad selections, announced that he would step down as manager on 30 June and be succeeded by assistant Tito Vilanova. Guardiola finished his tenure with Barça winning the Copa del Rey final 3–0, bringing the tally to 14 trophies that Barça had won under his coaching.

It was announced in summer of 2012 that Tito Vilanova, assistant manager at Barcelona, would take over from Pep Guardiola as manager. Following his appointment, Barcelona went on an incredible run that saw them hold the top spot on the league table for the entire season, recording only two losses and amassing 100 points. Their top scorer once again was Lionel Messi, who scored 46 goals in La Liga, including two hat-tricks. On 11 May 2013, Barcelona were crowned as the Spanish football champions for the 22nd time, still with four games left to play. Ultimately, Barcelona ended the season 15 points clear of rivals Real Madrid, despite losing 2–1 to them at the beginning of March. They reached the semi-final stage of both the Copa del Rey and the Champions League, going out to Real Madrid and Bayern Munich respectively. On 19 July, it was announced that Vilanova was resigning as Barcelona manager because his throat cancer had returned, and he would be receiving treatment for the second time after a three-month medical leave in December 2012.

2014–2020: Bartomeu era 
On 22 July 2013, Gerardo "Tata" Martino was confirmed as manager of Barcelona for the 2013–14 season. Barcelona won the 2013 Supercopa de España 1–1 on away goals. On 23 January 2014, Sandro Rosell resigned as president by the admissibility of a complaint for alleged misappropriation following the transfer of Neymar. Josep Maria Bartomeu replaced him to finish the term.

Barcelona won the treble in the 2014–15 season, winning La Liga, Copa del Rey and Champions League titles, and became the first European team to have won the treble twice. On 17 May, the club clinched their 23rd La Liga title after defeating Atlético Madrid. This was Barcelona's seventh La Liga title in the last ten years. On 30 May, the club defeated Athletic Bilbao in the Copa del Rey final at Camp Nou. On 6 June, Barcelona won the 2015 Champions League Final with a 3–1 win against Juventus, which completed the treble, the club's second in six years. Barcelona's attacking trio of Messi, Suárez and Neymar, dubbed "MSN", scored 122 goals in all competitions, the most in a season for an attacking trio in Spanish football history.

On 11 August, Barcelona started the 2015–16 season winning a joint record fifth European Super Cup by beating Sevilla 5–4 in the 2015 UEFA Super Cup. They ended the year with a 3–0 win over Argentine club River Plate in the 2015 Club World Cup final on 20 December to win the trophy for a record third time, with Suárez, Messi and Iniesta the top three players of the tournament. The Club World Cup was Barcelona's 20th international title, a record only matched by Egyptian club Al Ahly. By scoring 180 goals in 2015 in all competitions, Barcelona set the record for most goals scored in a calendar year, breaking Real Madrid's record of 178 goals scored in 2014. On 10 February 2016, qualifying for the sixth Copa del Rey final in the last eight seasons, Luis Enrique's Barcelona broke the club's record of 28 consecutive games unbeaten in all competitions set by Guardiola's team in the 2010–11 season, with a 1–1 draw with Valencia in the second leg of the 2015–16 Copa del Rey. With a 5–1 win at Rayo Vallecano on 3 March, Barcelona's 35th match unbeaten, the club broke Real Madrid's Spanish record of 34 games unbeaten in all competitions from the 1988–1989 season. After Barça reached 39 matches unbeaten, their run ended on 2 April 2016 with a 2–1 defeat to Real Madrid at Camp Nou. On 14 May 2016, Barcelona won their sixth La Liga title in eight seasons. The front three of Messi, Suárez and Neymar finished the season with 131 goals, breaking the record they had set the previous year for most goals by an attacking trio in a single season.

On 8 March 2017, Barcelona made the largest comeback in Champions League history in the 2016–17 UEFA Champions League Round of 16 second Leg, defeating Paris Saint-Germain 6–1 (aggregate score 6–5), despite losing the first leg in France by a score of 4–0. On 29 May 2017, former player Ernesto Valverde was named as Luis Enrique's successor. On 20 September 2017, Barcelona issued a statement exercising their stance on the 2017 Catalan referendum saying, "FC Barcelona, in holding the utmost respect for its diverse body of members, will continue to support the will of the majority of Catalan people, and will do so in a civil, peaceful, and exemplary way". The match against UD Las Palmas on the referendum day was requested to be postponed by the Barcelona board due to heavy violence in Catalonia, but it (the request) was declined by La Liga, therefore being held behind closed doors. Two directors, Jordi Monés and Carles Vilarrubí, handed in their resignations in protest at the game's being played. Winning La Liga for the 2017–18 season, on 9 May 2018, Barcelona defeated Villarreal 5–1 to set the longest unbeaten streak (43 games) in La Liga history. On 27 April 2019, Barcelona won their 26th La Liga title. However, the La Liga title was overshadowed by an improbable Champions League exit to Liverpool in the semi-finals, with Barça losing the second leg 0–4 after being up 3–0 after a home victory.

On 13 January 2020, following the loss to Atlético Madrid in the Spanish Supercup, former Real Betis coach Quique Setién replaced Ernesto Valverde as the new head coach of Barcelona. Ultimately Barcelona finished the season trophyless for first time in 12 years. On 17 August, the club confirmed that Setién had been removed from his position as manager with director of football Eric Abidal also dismissed from his position. Two days later, Ronald Koeman was appointed as the new head coach of Barcelona. Rising dissatisfaction among supporters due to worsening finances and decline on the pitch in the previous season led to Josep Maria Bartomeu announcing his resignation as president on 27 October 2020, to avoid facing a vote of no confidence from the club members.

2021–present: Return of Laporta and post Messi era 

On 7 March 2021, Joan Laporta was elected president of Barcelona with 54.28% of the vote. Barcelona won their 31st Copa del Rey, their only trophy under Ronald Koeman, after defeating Athletic Bilbao 4–0 in the final. In August 2021 Barcelona found themselves unable to comply with La Liga's Financial Fair Play requirements, and revealed a club debt of €1.35bn and a wage bill accounting for 103% of total income. Negotiations with Lionel Messi, now in the final year of his contract, had been ongoing for some time. However, on 5 August 2021, Barcelona announced that they would be unable to re-sign Messi to an extension due to La Liga regulations. This was despite the fact that the club and Messi had reached an agreement over the details of a new contract. Messi departed the club after 21 years as a Barça player, and the club's all-time leading goalscorer, and signed on a free transfer with French club Paris Saint-Germain. The financial implications also restricted Barcelona in the transfer market and as a result most of the incoming players were either free transfers or loans and they had to reduce players' wages to register the incoming players.

Poor performances in La Liga and the Champions League led to the sacking of Ronald Koeman on 28 October, with a club legend Xavi replacing him. Xavi could not reverse the fortunes in the Champions League, and Barcelona dropped down to the Europa League for the first time since 2003–04, subsequently exiting in the quarter-finals. In the domestic league, Xavi improved Barça's form and guided them from ninth to second, guaranteeing a Champions League spot next season. However, this also meant Barcelona finished trophyless after earlier Supercopa and Copa del Rey exits.

Support 

The nickname culer for a Barcelona supporter is derived from the Catalan cul (English: arse), as the spectators at the first stadium, Camp de la Indústria, sat with their culs over the stand. In Spain, about 25% of the population is said to be Barça sympathisers, second behind Real Madrid, supported by 32% of the population. Throughout Europe, Barcelona is the favourite second-choice club. The club's membership figures have seen a significant increase from 100,000 in the 2003–04 season to 170,000 in September 2009, the sharp rise being attributed to the influence of Ronaldinho and then-president Joan Laporta's media strategy that focused on Spanish and English online media. , the club has 143,086 memberships, called socis.

In addition to membership,  there are 1,264 officially registered fan clubs, called penyes, around the world. The fan clubs promote Barcelona in their locality and receive beneficial offers when visiting Barcelona. Among the best supported teams globally, Barcelona has the second highest social media following in the world among sports teams, with over 103 million Facebook fans , only behind Real Madrid with 111 million. The club has had many prominent people among its supporters, including Pope John Paul II, who was an honorary member, and former prime minister of Spain José Luis Rodríguez Zapatero.

Club rivalries

El Clásico 

There is often a fierce rivalry between the two strongest teams in a national league, and this is particularly the case in La Liga, where the game between Barcelona and Real Madrid is known as "The Classic" (El Clásico). From the start of national competitions the clubs were seen as representatives of two rival regions in Spain: Catalonia and Castile, as well as of the two cities. The rivalry reflects what many regard as the political and cultural tensions felt between Catalans and the Castilians, seen by one author as a re-enactment of the Spanish Civil War. Over the years, the head-to-head record between the two clubs is 100 victories for Madrid, 97 victories for Barcelona, and 52 draws.

As early as the 1930s, Barcelona "had developed a reputation as a symbol of Catalan identity, opposed to the centralising tendencies of Madrid". In 1936, when Francisco Franco started the Coup d'état against the democratic Second Spanish Republic, the president of Barcelona, Josep Sunyol, member of the Republican Left of Catalonia and Deputy to The Cortes, was arrested and executed without trial by Franco's troops (Sunyol was exercising his political activities, visiting Republican troops north of Madrid). During the dictatorships of Miguel Primo de Rivera and especially Francisco Franco, all regional languages and identities in Spain were frowned upon and restrained. As such, most citizens of Barcelona were in strong opposition to the fascist-like regime. In this period, Barcelona gained their motto Més que un club (English: More than a club) because of its alleged connection to Catalan nationalist as well as to progressive beliefs.

There's an ongoing controversy as to what extent Franco's rule (1939–75) influenced the activities and on-pitch results of both Barcelona and Real Madrid. Fans of both clubs tend to exaggerate the myths favouring their narratives. Most historians agree than Franco did not have a preferred football team, but his Spanish nationalist beliefs led him to associate himself with the establishment teams, such as Atlético Aviación and Madrid FC (that recovered its royal name after the fall of the Republic). On the other hand, he also wanted the renamed CF Barcelona succeed as "Spanish team" rather than a Catalan one. During the early years of Franco's rule, Real Madrid weren't particularly successful, winning two Copa del Generalísimo titles and a Copa Eva Duarte; Barcelona claimed three league titles, one Copa del Generalísimo and one Copa Eva Duarte. During that period, Atlético Aviación were believed to be the preferred team over Real Madrid. The most contested stories of the period include Real Madrid's 11–1 home win against Barcelona in the Copa del Generalísimo, where the Catalan team alleged intimidation, and the controversial transfer of Alfredo Di Stéfano to Real Madrid despite his agreement with Barcelona. The latter transfer was part of Real Madrid chairman Santiago Bernabéu's "revolution" that ushered in the era of unprecedented dominance. Bernabéu, himself a veteran of the Civil War who fought for Franco's forces, saw Real Madrid on top not only of Spanish but also European football, helping create the European Cup, the first true competition for Europe's best club sides. His vision was fulfilled when Real Madrid not only started winning consecutive league titles but also swept the first five editions of the European Cup in the 1950s. These events had a profound impact on Spanish football and influenced Franco's attitude. According to historians, during this time he realized the importance of Real Madrid for his regime's international image, and the club became his preferred team until his death. Fernando Maria Castiella, who served as Minister of Foreign Affairs under Franco from 1957 until 1969, noted that "[Real Madrid] is the best embassy we have ever had." Franco died in 1975, and the Spanish transition to democracy soon followed. Under his rule, Real Madrid had won 14 league titles, 6 Copa del Generalísimo titles, 1 Copa Eva Duarte, 6 European Cups, 2 Latin Cups and 1 Intercontinental Cup. In the same period, Barcelona had won 8 league titles, 9 Copa del Generalísimo titles, 3 Copa Eva Duarte titles, 3 Inter-Cities Fairs Cups and 2 Latin Cups.

The rivalry was intensified during the 1950s when the clubs disputed the signing of Alfredo Di Stéfano. Di Stéfano had impressed both Barcelona and Real Madrid while playing for Los Millionarios in Bogotá, Colombia, during a players' strike in his native Argentina. Soon after Millonarios' return to Colombia, Barcelona directors visited Buenos Aires and agreed with River Plate, the last FIFA-affiliated team to have held Di Stéfano's rights, for his transfer in 1954 for the equivalent of 150 million Italian lira (according to other sources 200,000 dollars). This started a battle between the two Spanish rivals for his rights. FIFA appointed Armando Muñoz Calero, former president of the Spanish Football Federation as mediator. Calero decided to let Di Stéfano play the 1953–54 and 1955–56 seasons in Madrid, and the 1954–55 and 1956–57 seasons in Barcelona. The agreement was approved by the Football Association and their respective clubs. Although the Catalans agreed, the decision created various discontent among the Blaugrana members and the president was forced to resign in September 1953. Barcelona sold Madrid their half-share, and Di Stéfano moved to Los Blancos, signing a four-year contract. Real paid 5.5 million Spanish pesetas for the transfer, plus a 1.3 million bonus for the purchase, an annual fee to be paid to the Millonarios, and a 16,000 salary for Di Stéfano with a bonus double that of his teammates, for a total of 40% of the annual revenue of the Madrid club.

Di Stéfano became integral in the subsequent success achieved by Real Madrid, scoring twice in his first game against Barcelona. With him, Madrid won the first five editions of the European Cup. The 1960s saw the rivalry reach the European stage when Real Madrid and Barcelona met twice in the European Cup, with Madrid triumphing en route to their fifth consecutive title in 1959–60 and Barcelona prevailing en route to losing the final in 1960–61. In 2002, the European encounter between the clubs was dubbed the "Match of The Century" by Spanish media, and Madrid's win was watched by more than 500 million people. An intense fixture which is marked by its indiscipline in addition to memorable goal celebrations from both teams – often involving mocking the opposition – such notable celebrations occurred in 2009 when Barcelona captain Carles Puyol kissed his Catalan armband in front of incensed Madrid fans at the Santiago Bernabéu Stadium and in 2017 when Lionel Messi celebrated his 93rd-minute winner for Barcelona against Real Madrid at the Bernabéu by taking off his Barcelona shirt and holding it up to incensed Real Madrid fans – with his name and number facing them.

El derbi Barceloní 

Barça's local rival has always been Espanyol. Blanc-i-blaus, being one of the clubs granted royal patronage, was founded exclusively by Spanish football fans, unlike the multinational nature of Barça's primary board. The founding message of the club was clearly anti-Barcelona, and they disapprovingly saw FC Barcelona as a team of foreigners. The rivalry was strengthened by what Catalonians saw as a provocative representative of Madrid. Their original ground was in the affluent district of Sarrià.

Traditionally, Espanyol was seen by the vast majority of Barcelona's citizens as a club which cultivated a kind of compliance to the central authority, in stark contrast to Barça's revolutionary spirit. Also in the 1960s and 1970s, while FC Barcelona acted as an integrating force for Catalonia's new arrivals from poorer regions of Spain expecting to find a better life, Espanyol drew their support mainly from sectors close to the regime such as policemen, military officers, civil servants and career fascists.

In 1918, Espanyol started a counter-petition against autonomy, which at that time had become a pertinent issue. Later on, an Espanyol supporter group would join the Falangists in the Spanish Civil War, siding with the fascists. Despite these differences in ideology, the derbi has always been more relevant to Espanyol supporters than Barcelona ones due to the difference in objectives. In recent years the rivalry has become less political, as Espanyol translated its official name and anthem from Spanish to Catalan.

Though it is the most played local derby in the history of La Liga, it is also the most unbalanced, with Barcelona overwhelmingly dominant. In the primera división league table, Espanyol has only managed to end above Barça on three occasions from 87 seasons (1928–2022) and the only all-Catalan Copa del Rey final was won by Barça in 1957. Espanyol has the consolation of achieving the largest margin win with a 6–0 in 1951, while Barcelona's biggest win was 5–0 on seven occasions (in 1933, 1947, 1964, 1975, 1992, 2016 and 2017). Espanyol achieved a 2–1 win against Barça during the 2008–09 season, becoming the first team to defeat Barcelona at Camp Nou in their treble-winning season.

Rivalry with AC Milan 

One of Barcelona's rivals in European football is Italian club AC Milan. The team against which Barcelona has played the most matches (19), it is also the second most played match in European competitions, tied with Real Madrid–Juventus and both after Real Madrid–Bayern Munich (24). Two of the most successful clubs in Europe, Milan has won seven European Cups to Barça's five, while both clubs have won a record five European Super Cups. Barcelona and Milan have won other continental titles, which make them the second and third most decorated teams in world football, with 20 and 18 titles respectively, both behind Real Madrid's 26.

Barcelona leads the head-to-head record with eight wins and five defeats. The first encounter between the two clubs was in the 1959–60 European Cup. They faced off in the round of 16 and Barça won the tie on a 7–1 aggregate score (0–2 in Milan and 5–1 in Barcelona). While Milan had never knocked Barcelona out of the European Cup, they beat Johan Cruyff's Dream Team 4–0 in the 1994 Champions League final, despite being the underdogs. In 2013, however, Barcelona made a "historic" comeback from a 0–2 first leg defeat in the round of 16 of the 2012–13 Champions League, winning 4–0 at the Camp Nou.

Ownership and finances 
 Along with Real Madrid, Athletic Bilbao, and Osasuna, Barcelona is organised as a registered association. Unlike a limited company, it is not possible to purchase shares in the club, but only membership. The members of Barcelona, called socis, form an assembly of delegates which is the highest governing body of the club. , the club has 143,086 socis.

In 2010, Forbes evaluated Barcelona's worth to be around €752 million (US$1 billion), ranking them fourth after Manchester United, Real Madrid and Arsenal, based on figures from the 2008–09 season. According to Deloitte, Barcelona had a recorded revenue of €366 million in the same period, ranking second to Real Madrid, who generated €401 million in revenue. In 2013, Forbes magazine ranked Barcelona the third most valuable sports team in the world, behind Real Madrid and Manchester United, with a value of $2.6 billion. In 2014, Forbes ranked them the second most valuable sports team in the world, worth $3.2 billion, and Deloitte ranked them the world's fourth richest football club in terms of revenue, with an annual turnover of €484.6 million. In 2017, Forbes ranked them the fourth most valuable sports team in the world with a team value of $3.64 billion. In 2018, Barcelona became the first sports team to surpass $1bn in annual revenues. In November 2018 Barcelona became the first sports team with average first-team pay in excess of £10m ($13.8m) per year. However, years of profligate spending under the leadership of Josep Maria Bartomeu (president between 2014 and 2020) and other factors, such as the COVID-19 pandemic, saw the club's gross debt rise to about $1.4 billion in 2021, much of it short-term.

Records 

In March 2021, Lionel Messi overtook Xavi's record of 767 games played for the club, and presently has made 778 official appearances in all competitions, while also holding the record for the most appearances in La Liga matches for Barcelona, with 520.

Barcelona's all-time highest goalscorer in official competitions is Lionel Messi with 672 goals, surpassing Paulino Alcántara's 369 goals in March 2014, a record which stood for 87 years. In December 2020, Messi also overtook Pelé’s 643 goals for Santos to become the highest official scorer for a single club. Messi is the record goalscorer for Barcelona in European and international club competitions, and the record league scorer with 474 goals in La Liga. Four other players have managed to score over 100 league goals for Barcelona: César Rodríguez (190), Luis Suárez (147), László Kubala (131) and Samuel Eto'o (108). Josep Samitier is the club's highest goalscorer in the Copa del Rey, with 64 goals.

László Kubala holds the La Liga record for most goals scored in one match, with seven goals against Sporting Gijón in 1952. Lionel Messi co-holds the Champions League record with five goals against Bayer Leverkusen in 2012. Eulogio Martínez became Barça's top goalscorer in a cup game, when he scored seven goals against Atlético Madrid in 1957.

Barcelona goalkeepers have won a record number of Zamora trophies (20), with Antoni Ramallets and Víctor Valdés winning a record five each. Valdés had a ratio of 0.832 goals-conceded-per-game, a La Liga record, and he also holds the record for longest period without conceding a goal (896 minutes) in all competitions for Barcelona. Claudio Bravo has the record of best unbeaten start in a season in La Liga history, at 754 minutes.

Barcelona's longest serving manager is Jack Greenwell, with nine years in two spells (1917–1924) and (1931–1933), and Pep Guardiola is the club's most successful manager (14 trophies in 4 years). The most successful Barcelona player is Lionel Messi with 35 trophies, surpassing Andrés Iniesta, with 32 trophies.

Barcelona's Camp Nou is the largest stadium in Europe. The club's highest home attendance was 120,000 in a European Cup quarter-final against Juventus on 3 March 1986. The modernisation of Camp Nou during the 1990s and the introduction of all-seater stands means the record will not be broken for the foreseeable future as the current capacity of the stadium is 99,354.

El Barça de les Cinc Copes is the first team in Spanish football to have won five trophies in a single season (1951–1952). Barcelona is the only club to have played in every season of European competitions since they started in 1955 counting non-UEFA competition Inter-Cities Fairs Cup. On 18 December 2009, alongside being the only Spanish club to achieve a continental treble, Barcelona became the first ever European football team to win six trophies in a calendar year (a sextuple). In January 2018, Barcelona signed Philippe Coutinho from Liverpool for €120 million, the highest transfer fee in club's history. In August 2017, Barcelona player Neymar transferred to Paris Saint-Germain for a world record transfer fee of €222 million.

In 2016, Barcelona's La Masia was ranked second by the International Centre for Sports Studies (CIES) as the most top-level players producing academy in the world.

Kits and crest 

The club's original crest was a quartered diamond-shaped crest topped by the Crown of Aragon and the bat of King James, and surrounded by two branches, one of a laurel tree and the other a palm. The club shared Barcelona's coat of arms, as a demonstration of its identification with the city and a desire to be recognised as one. In 1910, the club held a competition among its members to design a new crest. The winner was Carles Comamala, who at the time played for the club. Comamala's suggestion became the crest that the club wears today, with some minor variations. The crest consists of the St George Cross in the upper-left corner with the Catalan flag beside it, and the team colours at the bottom.

The blue and garnet colours of the shirt were first worn in a match against Hispania in 1900. Several competing theories have been put forth for the blue and garnet design of the Barcelona shirt. The son of the first president, Arthur Witty, claimed it was the idea of his father as the colours were the same as the Merchant Taylor's School team. Another explanation, according to author Toni Strubell, is that the colours are from Robespierre's First Republic. In Catalonia the common perception is that the colours were chosen by Joan Gamper and are those of his home team, FC Basel.

Since 1998, the club has had a kit deal with Nike. In 2016, the deal was renewed until 2028 for a record €155 million per year. The contract includes a clause sanctioning penalty or agreement termination anytime if Barcelona fail to qualify for the European competitions or is relegated from La Liga.

Kit suppliers and shirt sponsors

Anthems 

Throughout its history, the club has had various official songs. The anthem in use today is El Cant del Barça (The Song of Barça), composed in 1974 on the occasion of the club's 75th anniversary. Authors Josep Maria Espinás and Jaume Picas composed the lyrics in Catalan, while the music was composed by Manuel Valls.

The song was first performed on 27 November 1974 at the Camp Nou stadium before the match between FC Barcelona and the East Germany national team by a 3,500-man choir led by Oriol Martorell. On November 28, 1988, in celebration of the club's centenary, the song was performed by Catalan singer-songwriter Joan Manuel Serrat at the end of the festival at the Camp Nou stadium. Since the 2008–09 season, "Cant del Barça" has been featured on the official Barcelona jerseys.

El Cant del Barça is turned on before Barcelona games take place at the Camp Nou, especially during matches against Real Madrid and just before the start of the meeting. The song is also often played for supporters and fans to cheer, chant and celebrate the victory.

Stadium 

Barcelona initially played in the Camp de la Indústria. The capacity was about 6,000, and club officials deemed the facilities inadequate for a club with growing membership.

In 1922, the number of supporters had surpassed 20,000 and by lending money to the club, Barça was able to build the larger Camp de Les Corts, which had an initial capacity of 20,000 spectators. After the Spanish Civil War the club started attracting more members and a larger number of spectators at matches. This led to several expansion projects: the grandstand in 1944, the southern stand in 1946, and finally the northern stand in 1950. After the last expansion, Les Corts could hold 60,000 spectators.

After the construction was complete there was no further room for expansion at Les Corts. Back-to-back La Liga titles in 1948 and 1949 and the signing of László Kubala in June 1950, who would later go on to score 196 goals in 256 matches, drew larger crowds to the games. The club began to make plans for a new stadium. The building of Camp Nou commenced on 28 March 1954, before a crowd of 60,000 Barça fans. The first stone of the future stadium was laid in place under the auspices of Governor Felipe Acedo Colunga and with the blessing of Archbishop of Barcelona Gregorio Modrego. Construction took three years and ended on 24 September 1957 with a final cost of 288 million pesetas, 336% over budget.

In 1980, when the stadium was in need of redesign to meet UEFA criteria, the club raised money by offering supporters the opportunity to inscribe their name on the bricks for a small fee. The idea was popular with supporters, and thousands of people paid the fee. Later this became the centre of controversy when media in Madrid picked up reports that one of the stones was inscribed with the name of long-time Real Madrid chairman and Franco supporter Santiago Bernabéu. In preparation for the 1992 Summer Olympics two tiers of seating were installed above the previous roofline. It has a current capacity of 99,354 making it the largest stadium in Europe.

In December 2021, a record 88% of the club members voted in favor of the Espai Barça project to revamp the club's sporting facilities, being the first online referendum in FC Barcelona history. Originally projected to have been completed in 2021, it is now aimed to finish by the end of 2025, with an estimated €1.5 billion net funding.

There are also other facilities, which include:
 Ciutat Esportiva Joan Gamper (FC Barcelona's training ground)
 Masia-Centre de Formació Oriol Tort (Residence of young players)
 Estadi Johan Cruyff (Home of the reserve team, women's team, and Juvenil A)
 Palau Blaugrana (FC Barcelona indoor sports arena)
 Palau Blaugrana 2 (Secondary indoor arena of FC Barcelona)
 Palau de Gel (FC Barcelona ice rink)

Honours 

 
  Shared record
In 2015, Barcelona received the Nine Values Cup, an award of the international children's social programme Football for Friendship.

Players 

Spanish teams are limited to three players without EU citizenship. The squad list includes only the principal nationality of each player; several non-European players on the squad have dual citizenship with an EU country. Also, players from the ACP countries that are signatories to the Cotonou Agreement are not counted against non-EU quotas due to the Kolpak ruling.

Current squad

Reserve team and Youth Academy

Out on loan

Personnel

Current technical staff 

 
 
   Sergio Alegre

   Toni Lobo   David Prats

Football Sport Management

Management

Board of Directors 

{| class="wikitable"
|-
!Office
!Name
|-
| President
| Joan Laporta
|-
| First Vice PresidentDirector Responsible for Sporting AreaDirector of the Barça Foundation
| Rafael Yuste 
|-
| Vice PresidentDirector Responsible for Economic Area 
| Eduard Romeu
|-
| Institutional Vice President 
| Elena Fort
|-
| Vice PresidentDirector Responsible for Social Area
| Antonio Escudero
|-
| Vice PresidentDirector Responsible for Marketing Area
| Juli Guiu
|-
| Treasurer
| Ferran Olivé
|-
| SecretaryDirector Responsible for Basketball 
| Josep Cubells
|-
| Director Assistant to the Delegate Counsellor 
| Josep Maria Albert
|-
| Director Responsible for Rink Hockey
| Xavier Barbany
|-
| Director Responsible for Security
| Alfons Castro
|-
| Director Responsible for 'Espai Barça'
| Jordi Llauradó
|-
| Director Responsible for Social Area
| Josep Ignasi Macià
|-
| Director Responsible for Futsal
| Aureli Mas
|-
| Director Responsible for Women's Football 
| Xavier Puig
|-
| Director Responsible for Handball
| Joan Solé
|-
| Director Responsible for Youth Football
| Joan Soler
|-
| Board members
| Miquel Camps Àngel Riudalbas
|-
| President of Barça Atlétic
| Jordi Casals
|-

Filmography

See also 
 List of fan-owned sports teams
 La Masia
 Barcelona Femení
 Barcelona Atlètic
 Barcelona C
 Barcelona Futsal
 Barcelona Bàsquet
 Barcelona Handbol
 Barcelona Voleibol

References

Further reading

External links 

  
 FC Barcelona at La Liga 
 FC Barcelona at UEFA 
 
 

 
La Liga clubs
Football clubs in Barcelona
Football clubs in Catalonia
Copa del Rey winners
G-14 clubs
Catalan symbols
Unrelegated association football clubs
Association football clubs established in 1899
1899 establishments in Spain
Barcelona
B
B
B
B